Paolo Domenico Acerbis (born 5 May 1981) is an Italian footballer, who plays as a goalkeeper for Eccellenza club S.S.D. Mapello.

He also played for professional club Livorno in Serie A, as well as AlbinoLeffe, Triestina, Catania and Vicenza. He was suspended from 2012 to 2014. Since January 2015 Acerbis had played for several non fully professional clubs in Serie D and in Eccellenza Lombardy.

Career
After playing at AlbinoLeffe, from 2000 to 2005, he went on loan to Livorno, exchange with Paolo Ginestra then, in the Serie A, before returning to AlbinoLeffe at the end of the 2005–06 Serie A season.

He is the first choice goalkeeper since 2002.

In January 2008, he left AlbinoLeffe, for Triestina, to replace the left of Generoso Rossi who went to Catania in Serie A on loan as the third choice goal keeper.

In mid-2008 Acerbis joined Serie B side Grosseto, from Triestina. In Tuscany, Acerbis was the starting goalkeeper for the first part of the year before his January 2009 transfer to Catania.

On 3 January 2009 Acerbis signed for Serie A club Catania on loan, with Ciro Polito going to opposite direction. Both clubs would have the option to make the deals permanent at the end of the season. Acerbis became the third choice keeper at Catania behind veteran Albano Bizarri, and twenty-two-year-old Tomáš Košický.

On 31 August 2010 Acerbis was signed by Vicenza on a 2-year contract for €50,000 transfer fee. He was the backup keeper for Alberto Frison, Danilo Russo (2010–11) and Carlo Pinsoglio (2012).

Italian football scandal
He was one of the footballers that involved in 2011–12 Italian football scandal. After a plea bargain, he was suspended by Italian Football Federation for  years.

Non-professional years
Acerbis returned to football in January 2015, for Serie D, a division one tier lower than the fully professional league, the Lega Pro/Serie C. He left Seregno in June 2016.

In October 2016, he was signed by Eccellenza club Trevigliese. In mid-2018 he left for another Eccellenza club Tritium, which he won a Serie D promotion at the end of season.

Giana Erminio
On 30 January 2020, he returned to Serie C, signing with Giana Erminio.

Mapello
For the 2021-22 season, he joined to Eccellenza club S.S.D. Mapello.

References

External links 
 Acerbis' profile at LivornoCalcio.it
Player profile – RAI sport
 AIC profile 
 

1981 births
Living people
People from Clusone
Italian footballers
Association football goalkeepers
Serie A players
Serie B players
Serie C players
U.S. Livorno 1915 players
U.C. AlbinoLeffe players
U.S. Triestina Calcio 1918 players
Catania S.S.D. players
F.C. Grosseto S.S.D. players
Virtus Bergamo Alzano Seriate 1909 players
L.R. Vicenza players
Tritium Calcio 1908 players
A.S. Giana Erminio players
Sportspeople from the Province of Bergamo
Footballers from Lombardy